Mycoplasmatota is a phylum of bacteria that contains the class Mollicutes. The phylum was originally named "Tenericutes" (tener cutis: soft skin). Notable genera include Mycoplasma, Spiroplasma, Ureaplasma, and Candidatus Phytoplasma.

References 

 
Bacteria phyla